Roycroft is a surname. Notable people with the surname include:

Annie Roycroft (1926–2019), Ireland’s first female newspaper editor
Bill Roycroft (1915–2011), Australian equestrian
Chris Roycroft-Davis (born 1948), journalist
Clarke Roycroft (born 1950), Australian equestrian
Dan Roycroft (born 1978), Canadian cross-country skier
David Roycroft (born 1947), British diplomat
John Roycroft (born 1929), English chess composer and writer
Maurice Roycroft (born 1960), known as Maurice Seezer, Irish musician and composer
Wayne Roycroft (born 1946), Australian equestrian